After Hours is the seventh album led by saxophonist Hank Crawford featuring performances recorded in 1964 and 1965 for the Atlantic label.

Reception

AllMusic awarded the album 3½ stars with reviewer Scott Yanow calling it "A fine soulful crossover set that is quite accessible and melodic."

Track listing
 "After Hours" (Avery Parrish) - 5:31
 "Junction" (Benny Golson) - 3:58
 "Who Can I Turn To (When Nobody Needs Me)" (Leslie Bricusse, Anthony Newley) - 4:41
 "Next Time You See Me' (Ben Tucker) - 2:53
 "Soul Shoutin'" (Stanley Turrentine) - 2:50
 "Makin' Whoopee" (Walter Donaldson, Gus Kahn) - 4:30
 "When Did You Leave Heaven?" (Richard A. Whiting, Walter Bullock) - 4:22
 "The Back Slider" (Hank Crawford) - 4:22

Personnel 
Hank Crawford - alto saxophone, piano
Fielder Floyd, John Hunt - trumpet (tracks 1-5, 7 & 8)
Wendell Harrison - tenor saxophone (tracks 1-5, 7 & 8)
Howard Johnson (tracks 1-5 & 8), Alonzo Shaw (track 7) - baritone saxophone
Sonny Forriest (tracks 2, 3 7 5), Willie Jones (tracks 1, 4 & 8) - guitar 
Charles Dungey (tracks 3 & 5), Charles Green (tracks 6 & 7), Charles Lindsay (track 2), Ali Mohammed (tracks 1, 4 & 8) - bass
Joe Dukes (tracks 1, 3-5 & 8), Wilbert Hogan (track 2), Milt Turner (tracks 6 & 7) - drums

References 

1966 albums
Hank Crawford albums
Atlantic Records albums
Albums produced by Nesuhi Ertegun
Albums produced by Arif Mardin